Emma Drobná (born 24 March 1994) is a Slovak singer and the winner of Česko Slovenská SuperStar 2015. She sings mainly in English, although some of her tracks are with Slovak lyrics. In 2016 Drobná took part in the TV series Tvoja tvár znie povedome, although she did not reach the final. In 2017 she competed alongside Filip Buránsky in the sixth series of Slovak TV series Let's Dance. Drobná signed a sponsorship deal with Coca-Cola in 2018.

Discography

Studio albums
2016: Emma Drobná
2017: You Should Know
2020: Better Like This

References

External links

1994 births
Living people
People from Nové Mesto nad Váhom
21st-century Slovak women singers